A Wizard's Wings is a children's fantasy novel by T. A. Barron. A Wizard's Wings is the fifth book in a 12-book series known as The Merlin Saga. This book was originally published as The Wings of Merlin, the final book in the five -book series The Lost Years of Merlin,   providing a childhood story for Merlin, the legendary Arthurian wizard.

In the series, Merlin searches for his true identity while overcoming perilous odds as he learns to use his powers for good and discovers his strengths and weaknesses. Merlin is also given the task of ending evil in the land and finds out secrets of his past that change his life.

Plot summary

As winter approaches, Merlin must quickly unify Fincayra's  dwarves, canyon eagles, walking trees and other creatures against an invasion by Rhita Gawr while a mysterious killer hunts down the children of Fincayra.

2000 American novels
2000 children's books
American children's novels
Children's fantasy novels
Works based on Merlin
Modern Arthurian fiction